Newhouse is a hamlet and major road interchange located in North Lanarkshire, Scotland, sited immediately east of the Eurocentral industrial park, two miles west of the village of Salsburgh,  east of Holytown and about  north east of Motherwell.

It consists of four small houses, a Premier Inn hotel and Beefeater restaurant an independently operated Esso petrol station under the name "Peggy White's Ltd"and a garden centre. It also has a large industrial park, which is the United Kingdom base for several multinational companies including Terex, Honeywell and the Newhouse research site and the Scottish distribution centre for The Co-operative Food.

It was formerly a terminus for a railway line from Airdrie, and had several coal mines. Since the end of coal mining in the area these have gone, along with most of the inhabitants.

It was also a historic crossing place for north–south and east–west traffic, being on the two former trunk route of the A8 between Glasgow and Edinburgh and also on the A73 from Cumbernauld and the north, to Carlisle and the south and west of England. The road junction on which the hamlet is situated remains very busy and is prone to traffic congestion at peak times, since it is where the current A8, M8, A73 (now detrunked and supplanted by the M74), A775 and B7066 all meet.

It is notorious for its bad weather, as it is one of the highest points on the M8. The height also enables it to command a view over most of the Clyde Valley and Campsie Fells.

Keir Hardie, the founder of the Labour Party and one of the first two Labour Party MPs elected to the UK Parliament was born in a cottage on the western edge of Newhouse. This cottage still exists on Legbrannock Avenue, now surrounded by the Newhouse Industrial Estate.

Hotel and restaurant
The Newhouse Hotel was originally built in the 1930s as a public house and motel in a single building. The original building was built in an art-deco style, and while it still exists it has been extended with a wrap-around canopy and peaked roof added, and the art-deco windows and other features removed.

The original motel also had a small petrol filling station, but this was removed in the 1960s.

Following the takeover of the pub by Whitbread Inns, the hotel accommodation was removed and replaced by a function suite and staff residences. It then spent a time renamed as The Griffin, before being added to the Brewers Fayre chain, under its original name, The Newhouse.

In 1991, a 40-bedroom Travel Inn hotel was added adjacent to the original building. This building, which is still on site as a Premier Inn, and has been extended to have an extra 20 rooms, was only the second Travel Inn to be opened in Scotland by Whitbread. In 2006 the restaurant became the first Brewers Fayre to be refurbished by Whitbread to the Table Table theme. The restaurant is currently a Beefeater.

Location grid

References

Villages in North Lanarkshire